Looe is a coastal town and civil parish in south-east Cornwall, England, with a population of 5,280 at the 2011 census.

Looe developed as two separate towns each with MPs and its own mayor.

The town centres around a small harbour and along the steep-sided valley of the River Looe which flows between East and West Looe to the sea beside a sandy beach. Offshore to the west, opposite the stonier Hannafore Beach, lies Looe Island.

History

Prehistory and foundation
Archaeological evidence indicates that the area around Looe has been inhabited since the Neolithic period (although a possible series of ancient field systems, south of nearby Penarthtown, could suggest earlier Palaeolithic activity). A Neolithic stone axe, made of greenstone, was found in 1978 on a tidal gravel bank in the bed of West Looe River. Further Neolithic finds, such as flint arrow heads, have also been found in the fields above Trenant Point. Furthermore, the site of a large perfect Bronze Age tumulus and most likely the site for a post medieval beacon was located in a field just north of Hillcrest Nursing home in East Looe. Unfortunately, some time after 1823 the site was levelled, thus leaving no trace of the large barrow to be seen today. Additional tumuli have also been noted in the area of Looe, such as at the locally known Wooldown field and at the base of Shutta hill, however neither of the tumuli are visible today. Throughout the Looe area, there are also numerous Iron Age and Romano British forts. These include the nearby forts/settlements near Trelawne and Great Tree.

Additionally, there are some archaeological evidence to suggest there was some small scale Roman influence and possible occupation in Looe. For example, during the early 1800s, a very probable Roman urn was found whilst developing the road on St Martins hill. It is said that the urn was brown in colour, was about 10 inches high and contained several burnt human bone fragments. Close to the spot where the urn was found, a rock containing numerous specimens of bivalve shells, most likely Terebratula, was found. Unfortunately however, the exact location of the burial and the whereabouts of the urn has been lost to time. Subsequently, earthwork remains, of two rectilinear enclosures, can be seen using LiDar in fields near Trelawne just outside Looe. Morphology suggests that the southern enclosure could possibly be a Roman signal station however the site has never been formally excavated. Furthermore, pieces of a Roman amphorae, stone boat anchors, Roman coins and a number of late prehistoric or Romano-British finds have been made in the vicinity of nearby Looe Island. A large bronze ingot was found by divers to the south of the island. This has led to a number of historians to suggest that the island could possibly be Ictis, the tin trading island seen by Pytheas in the 4th century BC and recalled by Diodorus Siculus in the 1st century BC. Additionally, a small hoard of eight late Roman coins was recovered in 2008. These coins were recovered from one of the shallow ditches forming a 'pear shaped enclosure' which encompassed the top of Looe Island and the later Christian chapel site. All eight coins date to the late 3rd or early 4th century AD.

One of Looe's greatest archaeological mysteries is the so called 'Giant's Hedge', which is an ancient earthwork which runs over 9 miles between the Looe and Fowey Estuaries. In some places it is still twelve feet high, and where it is best preserved (for example, in Willake Wood) it is stone-faced and flanked by a ditch. Over the years, there have been many theories to what the ancient earthwork may have been or its intended purpose. While the name and early folklore suggests it was built by a giant, as the rhyme goes "One day, the Devil having nothing to do, built a great hedge from Lerryn to Looe", the general consensus is that this linear earthwork marked the boundary of a post-Roman kingdom. During the mid-18th century, British antiquarian William Borlase believed the earthwork to be the remnants of a roman road, that would connect Looe to the Fowey estuary. Whilst this theory is now disputed by some historians, there has been some archaeological finds, such as a hoard of roman coins found at Lerryn and a possible roman fort at Lanreath, that could back this theory. Other theories suggest that 'Giant's Hedge' is actually far more ancient and may even date back to the bronze age. For example, Dr Keith Ray, the County Archaeologist for Oxfordshire, who is making a special study of the Giant's Hedge, is convinced that it originally continued on the west side of the River Fowey and was defended there by Castle Dore. Along the Hedge, there are numerous bronze age barrows, hillforts and ancient enclosures. Such as the Hall Rings, Kilminorth fort, the fort at Yearle's Wood and many more. It is likely that the secrets behind 'Giant's Hedge' may never be known, perhaps the history of the Hedge could even be a combination of different time periods.

At the time of the Domesday Book in 1086 the manor of Pendrym, which included much of the site of modern-day East Looe, was still held by William the Conqueror, as part of his own demesne, which he later devolved to the Bodgrugan (Bodrigan) family. Land across the river belonged to the manors of Portalla (or Portallant) and Portbyhan (variously spelt Portbyan, Porthbyghan, Porthpyghan, among others).

Shutta, on the steep hillside over East Looe, is recorded as being inhabited by the 12th century. Between 1154 and 1189 Henry II granted a charter in favour of Sir Henry Bodrugan as Mayor of East Looe. West Looe was given free borough status sometime after this (the first known historical mention of the town dates from 1327) and in the 1230s East Looe secured the right to hold a weekly market and a Michaelmas fair. East Looe's layout looks like a "planted borough", a concept similar to modern new towns, since most of its streets form a grid-like pattern.

Low-lying parts of Looe continue to suffer frequent flooding when the tides are very high. For practical reasons, most fishermen's houses in ancient Looe, like elsewhere along the south coast, were constructed with their living quarters upstairs and a storage area at ground level below: for boats, tools and fishing tackle, etc; these are termed "fishermen's cellars".

Early churches
Some time before 1144, the Order of Saint Benedict occupied Looe Island, building a chapel there, and the monks established a rudimentary lighthouse service using beacons. Another chapel was founded on an opposite hillside just outside West Looe; both are now marked only by ruins.

The parish church of East Looe was at St Martin by Looe but there was a chapel of ease in the town. St Mary's Church, East Looe was dedicated in 1259 by Walter Bronscombe, Bishop of Exeter. Despite rebuilding commencing in 1805, it has since fallen into disrepair, although the original Tower still remains. On the centre of the bridge in medieval times stood the Chapel of St Anne (dedicated in 1436): this dedication was attributed to the town chapel by Dr George Oliver and has been adopted ever since, displacing that of St Mary.

West Looe comprised part of the parish of Talland since the early Middle Ages, but a chapel of ease, St Nicholas' Church, West Looe was extant before 1330 when it is recorded as being further endowed and enlarged. After spells as a common hall and a schoolhouse, this building has reverted to its original ecclesiastical use, having been substantially restored in 1852, 1862 and 1915.

Medieval era

The town was able to provide some 20 ships for the Siege of Calais in 1347.

An early wooden bridge over the Looe River was in place by 1411; but it burned down and was replaced by the first stone bridge, completed in 1436. This featured a chapel dedicated to St Anne in the middle. The current bridge, a seven-arched Victorian bridge, was opened in 1853. By that time Looe had become a major port, one of Cornwall's largest, exporting local tin, arsenic and granite, as well as hosting thriving fishing and boatbuilding industries.

With effective civic leadership, Looe thrived in the Middle Ages and Tudor era, being both a busy port and situated with close access to the main road from London to Penzance. By then the textile industry was an important part of the town's economy, in addition to the traditional boatbuilding and fishing (particularly pilchards and crabs). Trade and transport to and from thriving Newfoundland also contributed to the town's success. The Old Guildhall in East Looe is believed to have dated from around 1500.

The constituencies of East Looe and West Looe were incorporated as parliamentary boroughs in 1571 and 1553 respectively. They both survived as rotten boroughs. and each returned two Members of Parliament (MPs) to the unreformed House of Commons until the Great Reform Act of 1832. For example, Admiral Sir Charles Wager, a son and grandson of Kentish mariners, was an MP for West Looe early in his political career (1713–1715) and at the end of it (1741–1743). The seal of East Looe was blazoned An antique one-mast vessel in it a man and boy against the side of the hulk three escutcheons each charges with three bends, with the legend "Si, comunetatis de Loo". The seal of West Looe was An armed man holding a bow in his right hand and an arrow in his left, with the legend "Por-tu-an vel Wys Westlo".

17th century
In June 1625, the fishing port of Looe was raided by Barbary pirates who streamed into the cobbled streets and forced their way into cottages and taverns. Much to their fury, they discovered that the villagers had been forewarned of their arrival and many had fled into the surrounding orchards and meadows to escape. The pirates still managed to seize eighty mariners and fishermen. Those unfortunate individuals were led away in chains to North Africa to be enslaved, and the town itself was torched.

19th century
By the start of the 1800s, Looe's fortunes were in decline. The Napoleonic Wars had taken their toll on the country; in 1803, the town formed a volunteer company to man guns in defence against attack from the French. The blockade of 1808, which prevented the Looe fleet from reaching their pilchard-fishing areas, also put considerable financial strain on the community. In 1805, the old St. Mary's Chapel (apart from the tower) had to be demolished due to dilapidation, and in 1817, the town was badly damaged by heavy storms and flooding.

With the building of the Liskeard and Looe Union Canal linking Looe to Liskeard in 1828, and the development of booming copper mines in the Caradon area from 1837, Looe's fortunes began to revive. The Herodsfoot mine produced 13,470 tons of lead between 1848 and 1884 and more than 17 tons of silver between 1853 and 1884. The canal was used first to transport lime from Wales for use in Cornish farming, and later to carry copper and granite between the railhead at Liskeard (from where rail links reached to the Cheesewring on Bodmin Moor) and the port of Looe. In 1856 the large quay of East Looe was built to handle the demands of the shipping trade, and in 1860, with the canal unable to keep up with demand, a railway was built linking Looe to Moorswater near Liskeard, along the towpath of the canal, which was used less and less until, by 1910, traffic ceased entirely. The railway was later linked to Liskeard proper, and as the mining boom came to an end, it adapted to carry passengers in 1879.

In 1866, a lifeboat station had been established on East Looe Beach, and in 1878 a new town hall was built: Looe's present-day Guildhall. Around this time recommendations were made that the two towns be merged under one governing body, and despite much protest Looe Urban District Council was formed in 1898 with jurisdiction over the communities on both sides of the River Looe.

20th century

With the Victorian fashion for seaside holidays, Looe evolved as a tourist town, with nearby Talland Bay being dubbed "the playground of Plymouth". This trend continued throughout the 20th century; more and more hotels and tourist facilities were built in the town, and Looe grew and prospered, with peaks in fishing and boatbuilding following the First and Second World Wars.

New Zealand writer Katherine Mansfield stayed in Looe for spring and summer 1918, while recovering from tuberculosis. She joined there her long-time friend the American painter Anne Estelle Rice, who famously painted her in red. The Portrait of Katherine Mansfield made in Looe has been exhibited since 1946 in the Te Papa Tongarewa museum of New Zealand.

The BBC drama Beyond Paradise, which first aired in 2023, was filmed in and around Looe.

Looe today

Looe remains a fishing town, and retained several fish dealers operating from the East Looe quayside until the advent of EU regulations. With its fleet of small fishing boats returning their catches to port daily, Looe has a reputation for procuring excellent fresh fish. The town is also a centre for shark fishing, and is home to the Shark Angling Club of Great Britain.

Nonetheless, Looe's main business today is tourism, with much of the town given over to hotels, guest houses and holiday homes, along with a large number of pubs, restaurants and beach equipment, ice cream and Cornish pasty vendors. Inland from Looe lie many camping and caravan sites, as well as the famous Woolly Monkey Sanctuary. Other local attractions include the beaches, sailing, fishing and diving, and spectacular coastal walks (especially via Talland to Polperro). South East Cornwall boasts several stately homes, including Antony House, Cotehele, Mount Edgcumbe and Lanhydrock House, as well as the Eden Project near St Austell which tourists can access by road.

Outside the busy summer months, the town remains a centre for shopping and entertainment for local villagers. Annually in late September, the town is the destination of choice for thousands of music lovers and top name performers for the Looe Music Festival, which takes place in temporary venues around the town, harbour and on East Looe beach.

There is a tradition of the townsfolk wearing fancy dress on New Year's Eve, when the streets are thronged with revellers in inventive outfits. Looe has been on the list of the top ten places in the UK to celebrate New Year, and ranked third on the list for 2007–08. Looe is regenerating itself, like many other ports, to serve as a small cargo port. On the high ground north of East and West Looe there are many modern houses and a recreational area called 'the Downs'.

East Looe

East Looe centres on its broad sandy beach, with the distinctive Banjo Pier designed by Joseph Thomas, a new lifeboat station and St Mary's Church. Stretching back from the church is a grid of narrow streets forming the main business area of the town, packed with many small shops, restaurants and pubs and the Old Guildhall, now a museum. Along the estuary lies the quay with its fish merchants. Towards Looe Bridge lies the Victorian Guildhall, and just north of the bridge the railway station. This is the terminus of the Looe Valley branch line to Liskeard, where it connects to the Great Western Main Line and services to London Paddington.

On the hilltop above East Looe lies Shutta, and beyond that the Sunrising housing estate and Looe Community Academy. Along the cliffs to the east is Plaidy Beach, and further on the bay and village of Millendreath.

It is covered by the Looe East division of Cornwall Council.

West Looe

West Looe spreads west from the bridge on the Polperro Road towards Sclerder, and along the river south of the bridge, with hotels, restaurants and boarding houses along the waterfront and houses climbing the perilous cliff above, towards a cluster of shops and businesses and the Church of St. Nicholas.

West Looe rises onto the Downs, a public recreation ground, well known for local dog walkers. Beyond this is West Looe cemetery, as well as Porthbythan Road, Goonwartha Road and Tregarrick.

Further south along the coast road is Hannafore Point, marking the edge of Looe Harbour, with to the west the wide, stony Hannafore Beach, facing across a narrow channel to Looe Island. Beyond lies the coastal path leading to Portnadler Bay, Talland and Porthallow, and then onward to Polperro. Two towers mark one end of a nautical measured mile, the other end is marked by two towers near Talland Bay.

It is part of the Looe West, Lansallos and Lanteglos division of Cornwall Council.

New Year festivities
On New Year's Eve, Looe provides a surprisingly exciting and large celebration. The small fishing town, usually quiet in winter, due to the largely seasonal economy, is host to an influx of visitors. People flock to the streets in their hundreds, wearing fancy dress, a tradition upheld by all ages. The crowds begin the evening in the town and slowly move towards the seafront for a fireworks display to see in the New Year.

Twinning
Looe is twinned with Quiberon in Brittany, France.

See also
 People from Looe

References

External links

 
 Looe Town Council
 Looe official website
 Looe Chamber of Commerce website
 Cornwall Record Office Online Catalogue for Looe

 
Towns in Cornwall
Ports and harbours of Cornwall
Beaches of Cornwall
Seaside resorts in Cornwall
Civil parishes in Cornwall
Fishing communities in England